The Unbearable Lightness of Being Original Soundtrack Recording is the official soundtrack album for the 1988 film of the same name, an adaptation of the Milan Kundera novel. The soundtrack is composed of various classical pieces by Czech composer Leoš Janáček as well as a Czech language translation of the Beatles' song "Hey Jude", performed by Marta Kubišová, and the traditional Czechoslovakian folk song "Joj, Joj, Joj", performed by Jarmila Šuláková and Vojtěch Jochec.

Background

According to a liner essay by Grover Sales, the idea of utilising the music of Leoš Janáček was first suggested by Milan Kundera towards the beginning of the film's production. Kundera's father was a concert musician and a proponent of Janáček's music. The two non-classical pieces in the film, a Czech version of "Hey Jude" and the traditional Czechoslovakian song "Joj, Joj, Joj", were chosen to reflect the utilisation of rock and jazz music as tools of protest against the Soviet government during the period surrounding the Prague Spring.

Track listing

References

External links
 Discogs

1988 soundtrack albums